is a former Japanese football player.

Playing career
Shogo Matsuo played for Arte Takasaki, AC Nagano Parceiro and FC Ryukyu from 2010 to 2015.

References

External links

1987 births
Living people
Kokushikan University alumni
Association football people from Kumamoto Prefecture
Japanese footballers
J3 League players
Japan Football League players
Arte Takasaki players
AC Nagano Parceiro players
FC Ryukyu players
Association football forwards